Juan Elias Garcia (born January 12, 1993) is a Salvadoran-American man on the FBI Ten Most Wanted Fugitives list for killing his 19-year-old ex-girlfriend and letting fellow MS-13 gang members shoot her two-year-old son as he grabbed Garcia's leg for help. The murder occurred on February 4, 2010, while Garcia was added to the list on March 26, 2014. He surrendered only days after being on the list.

Garcia was convicted in March 2013 of the murders of Vanessa Argueta and Diego Torres.

References

1993 births
Fugitives
Living people
Male murderers
MS-13
People from La Unión Department